Medical Apartheid: The Dark History of Medical Experimentation on Black Americans from Colonial Times to the Present is a 2007 book by Harriet A. Washington. It is a history of medical experimentation on African Americans. From the era of slavery to the present day, this book presents the first detailed account of black Americans' abuse as unwitting subjects of medical experimentation.

Synopsis
Medical Apartheid traces the complex history of medical experimentation on Black Americans in the United States since the middle of the eighteenth century. Harriet Washington argues that "diverse forms of racial discrimination have shaped both the relationship between white physicians and black patients and the attitude of the latter towards modern medicine in general".
  
The book is divided into three parts: the first is about the cultural memory of medical experimentation; the second examines recent cases of medical abuse and research; while the last addresses the complex relationship between racism and medicine. Some topics discussed are well-known, such as the Tuskegee syphilis experiment (193272), in which African Americans with the disease were intentionally denied treatment (without being told) in order to allow the progression of the disease so it could be observed in all stages, but other episodes are less well known to the general public. The book also mentions cases of medical experimentation in Africa and their links to African-American cases.

Topics covered

James Marion Sims 
James Marion Sims, born in Hanging Rock, South Carolina, was widely considered to be the "father of gynecology". Washington uses her book to expose Sims by detailing the misdiagnosis of the medical conditions which his patients suffered from during his medical training and the mistreatment of black slave women that led to his medical breakthrough.

In the beginning of its excerpt on Sims, the book details how he would blame the wrong parties for diseases and infections, such as neonatal tetanus. Neonatal tetanus is a bacterial disease which is caused by animal manure and it grows in wounds such as umbilical stumps. Instead of blaming the slave owners for not providing proper and clean living areas for these slaves to live in, Sims blamed slave women's supposed laziness as the cause of their diseases.

Washington also mentioned the exploitation of black slave bodies when she talked about the mistreatment of black infants during the 1800s. Sims used their bodies for tetany experiments. Sims determined through his research that the cause of tetany in the babies was a result of the movement of skull bones during birth. In order to test his theory, he took a black baby and, using a shoemaker's tools, opened the baby's brain based on his belief that black babies' skulls grew faster than the skulls of white babies, preventing their brains from growing or developing. Most of the babies died and he blamed their deaths on their supposed lack of intelligence.

The most infamous example of Sims' medical malpractice was his research on vesicovaginal fistulas. Sims acquired four female slaves and used their bodies in order to find a cure for the complication of childbirth. Sims put the slave women through painful surgeries without giving any of them anesthesia and he was eventually able to find the cure. As Washington said in the book, "he claimed that his procedures were 'not painful enough to justify the trouble and risk of attending the administration,' but this claim rings hollow when one learns that Sims always administered anesthesia when he performed the perfected surgery to repair the vaginas of white women in Montgomery a few years later. Sims also cited the popular belief that blacks did not feel pain in the same way as whites." (7) Despite this, he received much fame and attention for his breakthrough. Because of his use of black women, Sims was eventually able to help white women who experienced vesicovaginal fistulas, but black women still did not have access to these treatments and many of them died from the same disease that the slave women helped to cure. Along with not giving them anesthesia, he mistreated the women, making them completely undress, then kneel on their hands and knees while doctors examined their vaginas.

Awards
Medical Apartheid won the 2007 National Book Critics Circle Award for Nonfiction. Harriet Washington has been a fellow in ethics at the Harvard Medical School (HMS), a fellow at the Harvard School of Public Health, and a senior research scholar at the National Center for Bioethics at Tuskegee University.

See also
 The Plutonium Files
 Acres of Skin
 List of medical ethics cases
 Compulsory sterilization in the United States
 Medical racism in the United States
 Unethical human experimentation in the United States

References

2007 non-fiction books
American history books
History books about medicine
21st-century history books
Books about African-American history
Human subject research in the United States
Medical books
National Book Critics Circle Award-winning works
Human rights abuses in the United States
Race and health in the United States
Doubleday (publisher) books
J. Marion Sims